Peter Wells (born 27 May 1982) is a British rower who competed in the 2004 Summer Olympics.

References

Rowers at the 2004 Summer Olympics
Olympic rowers of Great Britain
British male rowers
Sportspeople from Hexham
1982 births
Living people